The Yovkovtsi Reservoir (язовир „Йовковци“) is situated in northeastern Bulgaria,  away of the town of Elena. It was built 20 years ago on the Veselina River. The reservoir is located in the territory of Elena municipality, and supplies water to Veliko Tarnovo, Gorna Oryahovitsa, Lyaskovets, Strazhitsa, Zlataritsa, Elena, Gabrovo and Dryanovo.  of the reservoir are hygienic protected zone. The dam is rich in carp, pikeperch and many other kinds of fish.

It is named after the prominent writer Yordan Yovkov.

Reservoirs in Bulgaria
Landforms of Veliko Tarnovo Province